Cape Breton South and Richmond was a federal electoral district in the province of Nova Scotia, Canada, that was represented in the House of Commons of Canada from 1917 to 1925.

This riding was created in 1914 from Cape Breton South and Richmond ridings, It consisted of the electoral district of South Cape Breton and the county of Richmond.

It was abolished in 1924 when it was redistributed into Cape Breton South and Richmond—West Cape Breton. The riding was a dual-member constituency—it elected two members to Parliament.

Members of Parliament

This riding elected the following Members of Parliament:

Election results

See also 

 List of Canadian federal electoral districts
 Past Canadian electoral districts

External links 
 Riding history for Cape Breton South and Richmond (1914–1924) from the Library of Parliament

Former federal electoral districts of Nova Scotia